is a Japanese jazz singer under the Giza Studio label. In years 2012-2016 she was vocalist of group Natsuiro.

Biography
In February 2006, she debuted with Hazuki Morita as Morikawa Natsuki and Morita Hazuki unit, released together one single Amazing Grace and one studio album Jazz Cover.

In 2008, she started her solo career as a soloist jazz singer. In March released first studio album & Jazz. In September, two covered songs Your song and Lullaby of Birdland appeared in Giza Studio's jazz compilation album Flavor Jazz: GIZA Jazz compilation vol.1. In October, she released second studio album P-Rhythm.

In March 2009, she released her third studio album Primavera. Two of her covered songs As Time Goes by and Feel Like Makin' Love appeared in Giza Studio's compilation Flavor Jazz: GIZA Jazz compilation vol.2

In years 2010-2012 Natsuki was the main personality of her radio program Shin-Kobe Jazz Monogatari at Radio Kansai.

In December 1, 2010, she had participated in Giza Studio's Christmas cover album "Christmas Non-Stop Carol" covering White Christmas by Irving Berlin.

In 2012, she formed pop group Natsuiro under Giza sub-label D-go. Their debut single was used in media as an opening theme for Anime television series Detective Conan. Four years later, the group went to the hiatus by announcement through their official website after lyricist left the band.

Since 2013, Natsuki regularly held live with instrumental band Sensation and recorded together full length album 4 Ever.

In 2016, Natsuki released her first cover album of Japanese songs J:Sentimental Cover.

In August 2018, Natsuki has launched her Official Twitter account.

Discography

Studio album

Magazine appearances
From Music Freak Magazine:
March 2008 Vol.159
May 2008 Vol.161
October 2008 Vol.166
February 2009 Vol.170
March 2009 Vol.171
April 2009 Vol.172
May 2009 Vol.173
June 2009 Vol.174
August 2009 Vol.176
November 2009 Vol.179

From Music freak magazine ES:
June 2011 Vol.18
August 2012 Vol.32
January 2014 Vol.49

References

External links
Official website

Living people
Being Inc. artists
1985 births
Japanese women jazz singers
21st-century Japanese singers
Musicians from Osaka Prefecture
People from Suita
21st-century Japanese women singers